Ronald Draper (born July 8, 1967 in Los Angeles, California) is a retired American basketball player. A graduate of Pomona High School in California, Draper played for  Mount San Antonio College and South Florida Community College before playing at American University from 1988–1990.

College

Draper played for American University after previously attending two Junior Colleges, Mount San Antonio College and South Florida Community College . The 6'9" Draper averaged 16.4 points and 12.0 rebounds in 1988–1989 to help American finish 17–11. In 1989–90 Draper averaged 16.1 points and 12.2 rebounds as American went 20–9.

Professional Teams
 1990–91: Quad City Thunder (CBA)
 1990–91: Grand Rapids Hoops (CBA)
 1991: CB Málaga (Spain)
 1991–92: Galatasaray (Turkish Basketball League)
 1992–95: Daiwa Securitis (Japan)
 1995–96: Basketball Club Oostende (Belgium)
 1995–96: Racing Club de Avellaneda (Argentina)
 1995–96: Gaiteros del Zulia (Venezuela)
 1997–98: Atléticos de San Germán (Puerto Rico)
 1998–99: Olympique Antibes (France)
 1999–00: Panathinaikos Limassol (Cyprus)
 2000–01: Legia Warszawa (Poland)

Awards
Venezuelan league (1): 1995–96

Highlights
CBA All-Star Game: 1990, 1991

References

 ACB profile
 

1967 births
Living people
American Eagles men's basketball players
American expatriate basketball people in Argentina
American expatriate basketball people in Belgium
American expatriate basketball people in Cyprus
American expatriate basketball people in France
American expatriate basketball people in Japan
American expatriate basketball people in Poland
American expatriate basketball people in Spain
American expatriate basketball people in Turkey
American expatriate basketball people in Venezuela
Atléticos de San Germán players
Basketball players from Los Angeles
Baloncesto Málaga players
Centers (basketball)
CBA All-Star Game players
Gaiteros del Zulia players
Grand Rapids Hoops players
Liga ACB players
Niigata Albirex BB players
Quad City Thunder players
American men's basketball players
Galatasaray S.K. (men's basketball) players